The men's foil was one of seven fencing events on the fencing at the 1952 Summer Olympics programme. It was the eleventh appearance of the event. The competition was held from 23 July 1952 to 24 July 1952. 61 fencers from 25 nations competed. All three medallists were left-handed. Nations were limited to three fencers each since 1928. The event was won by Christian d'Oriola of France, the nation's second consecutive victory in the men's foil and sixth overall. D'Oriola was the fifth man to win multiple medals in the event. The silver and bronze medals were won by Edoardo Mangiarotti and Manlio Di Rosa of Italy.

Background
This was the 11th appearance of the event, which has been held at every Summer Olympics except 1908 (when there was a foil display only rather than a medal event). Six of the eight finalists from 1948 returned: gold medalist Jehan Buhan and silver medalist Christian d'Oriola of France, bronze medalist Lajos Maszlay of Hungary, fourth-place finisher John Emrys Lloyd of Great Britain (in his fourth Games), sixth-place finisher Manlio Di Rosa of Italy, and seventh-place finisher Paul Valcke of Belgium. The Italian and French teams, as usual, were strong. For the French, d'Oriola was the 1947 and 1949 world champion and Buhan had been on the podium in 1950 and 1951. For the Italians, Edoardo Mangiarotti had finished third in 1949 and second in 1951 and Manlio Di Rosa had won in 1951.

Colombia, Ireland, Luxembourg, and Turkey each made their debut in the men's foil. The United States made its 10th appearance, most of any nation, having missed only the inaugural 1896 competition.

Competition format

The event used a four-round format. In each round, the fencers were divided into pools to play a round-robin within the pool. Bouts were to five touches. The 1952 tournament introduced byes for the fencers from the top 4 nations in the team foil event, who advanced directly to the quarterfinals. Ties were broken through fence-off bouts ("barrages") in early rounds if necessary for determining advancement. Ties not necessary for advancement were either not broken (if at least one fencer had not finished all bouts in the round-robin) or broken first by touches received and then by touches scored. In the final, ties were broken by barrage if necessary for medal placement but otherwise first by touches received and then by touches scored. Standard foil rules were used, including that touches had to be made with the tip of the foil, the target area was limited to the torso, and priority determined the winner of double touches.
 Round 1: There were 7 pools of 6–8 fencers each. The top 4 fencers in each pool advanced to the quarterfinals.
 Quarterfinals: There were 6 pools of 6–7 fencers each. The top 3 fencers in each quarterfinal advanced to the semifinals.
 Semifinals: There were 3 pools of 6 fencers each. The top 3 fencers in each semifinal advanced to the final.
 Final: The final pool had 9 fencers.

Schedule

All times are Eastern European Summer Time (UTC+3)

Results

Round 1

The top 4 finishers in each pool advanced to the quarterfinals. Fencers from the four teams that advanced to the final of the men's team foil event received byes through round 1:
 Egypt: Salah Dessouki, Mohamed Ali Riad, and Mahmoud Younes
 France: Jéhan Buhan, Christian d'Oriola, and Jacques Lataste
 Italy: Giancarlo Bergamini, Manlio Di Rosa, and Edoardo Mangiarotti
 Hungary: Lajos Maszlay, Endre Palócz, and Endre Tilli

Pool 1

Pool 2

Paul defeated Lund in a barrage for fourth place.

Pool 3

Iesi defeated Thuillier in a barrage for fourth place.

Pool 4

Pool 5

Pool 6

Lindeman and Vîlcea defeated Rodríguez in a three-way barrage for third and fourth places.

Pool 7

Quarterfinals

The top 3 finishers in each pool advanced to the semifinals.

Quarterfinal 1

Quarterfinal 2

Quarterfinal 3

Quarterfinal 4

d'Oriola and Tilli defeated Uralov in a three-way barrage for second and third place.

Quarterfinal 5

Quarterfinal 6

Lubell prevailed over Magnusson, Chelaru, and Fethers in a four-way barrage for third place.

Semifinals

The top 3 finishers in each pool advanced to the final.

Semifinal 1

Tilli defeated Verhalle in a barrage for third place.

Semifinal 2

Dessouki defeated Maszlay in a barrage for third place.

Semifinal 3

Final

References

Foil men
Men's events at the 1952 Summer Olympics